Mr. Jun Hirakawa  is a Japanese lens designer best known for creating the Pentax FA 43mm Limited and FA 77mm Limited lenses during his time at Pentax.

Hirakawa said at the time that he regretted his "early retirement" from Pentax in 2010, around the time that Hoya acquired the company, and was subsequently hired by Tamron.

List of credited lens designs
Hirakawa is credited with designing:
 DA 10-17mm f/3.5-4.5 Fisheye (co-developed with Takayuki Ito)
 DA 14mm f/2.8
 DA 40mm f/2.8 Limited (based on the smc PENTAX-M 1:2.8 40mm)
 DA 50-200 f/4-5.6
 DA 55-300 f/4-5.8
 DA* 55mm f/1.4
 F 17-28mm f/3.5-4.5 Fisheye
 F 35-80mm f/4-5.6
 F* 600mm f/4
 FA 28-105mm f/4-5.6
 FA 28mm f/2.8 AL
 FA 28mm f/2.8 SOFT
 FA 35mm f/2
 FA 43mm Limited
 FA 70-200mm f/4-5.6
 FA 77mm Limited (based on the smc PENTAX-A* 1:1.4 85mm)
 FA* 24mm f/2
 FA* 80-200mm f/2.8
 FA* 85mm f/1.4
 FA* 600mm f/4
 Tamron SP 24-70mm f/2.8 (2011)
 Unreleased 31mm f/2.4 prototype for the FA Limited series
 Unreleased wide-angle (80mm on 6x7 or 65mm on 645) f/2.8 (1986)
 Unreleased 70-300mm f/4-5.8 (1987)
 Unreleased 100-400mm f/5.6 (1992, with Koichi Maruyama)
 Unreleased 400mm f/4.5 (1988)

References

External links

 
 
 Hirakawa Jun on Camera-wiki.org
 Hirakawa patents on patentgenius.com

Optical engineers
Pentax people
Japanese industrial designers
Living people
Year of birth missing (living people)